Rossouw is a town in Joe Gqabi District Municipality in the Eastern Cape province of South Africa.

References

Populated places in the Senqu Local Municipality